Alexandru Rotaru (born 28 February 1929) is a Romanian rower. He competed in the men's eight event at the 1952 Summer Olympics.

References

External links
 
 

1929 births
Possibly living people
Romanian male rowers
Olympic rowers of Romania
Rowers at the 1952 Summer Olympics
Place of birth missing (living people)